In ancient Greek religion and mythology, the Muses are the inspirational goddesses of literature, science, and the arts. They were considered the source of the knowledge embodied in the poetry, lyric songs, and myths that were related orally for centuries in ancient Greek culture.

Melete, Aoede, and Mneme are the original Boeotian Muses, and Calliope, Clio, Erato, Euterpe, Melpomene, Polyhymnia, Terpsichore, Thalia, and Urania are the nine Olympian Muses.

In modern figurative usage, a muse is a literal person or supernatural force that serves as someone's source of artistic inspiration.

Etymology

The word Muses perhaps came from the o-grade of the Proto-Indo-European root  (the basic meaning of which is 'put in mind' in verb formations with transitive function and 'have in mind' in those with intransitive function), or from root  ('to tower, mountain') since all the most important cult-centres of the Muses were on mountains or hills. R. S. P. Beekes rejects the latter etymology and suggests that a Pre-Greek origin is also possible.

Number and names 

The earliest known records of the Muses come from Boeotia (Boeotian muses). Some ancient authorities regarded the Muses as of Thracian origin. In Thrace, a tradition of three original Muses persisted.

In the first century BC, Diodorus Siculus cited Homer and Hesiod to the contrary, observing:

Diodorus states (Book I.18) that Osiris first recruited the nine Muses, along with the satyrs, while passing through Aethiopia, before embarking on a tour of all Asia and Europe, teaching the arts of cultivation wherever he went.

According to Hesiod's account (c. 600 BC), generally followed by the writers of antiquity, the Nine Muses were the nine daughters of Zeus and Mnemosyne (i.e., "Memory" personified), figuring as personifications of knowledge and the arts, especially poetry, literature, dance and music.

The Roman scholar Varro (116–27 BC) relates that there are only three Muses: one born from the movement of water, another who makes sound by striking the air, and a third who is embodied only in the human voice. They were called Melete or "Practice", Mneme or "Memory" and Aoide or "Song". The Quaestiones Convivales of Plutarch (46–120 AD) also report three ancient Muses (9.I4.2–4).

However, the classical understanding of the Muses tripled their triad and established a set of nine goddesses, who embody the arts and inspire creation with their graces through remembered and improvised song and mime, writing, traditional music, and dance. It was not until Hellenistic times that the following systematic set of functions became associated with them, and even then some variation persisted both in their names and in their attributes:

According to Pausanias, who wrote in the later second century AD, there were originally three Muses, worshipped on Mount Helicon in Boeotia: Aoide ('song' or 'tune'), Melete ('practice' or 'occasion'), and Mneme ('memory'). Together, these three form the complete picture of the preconditions of poetic art in cult practice.

In Delphi too three Muses were worshiped, but with other names: Nete, Mese, and Hypate, which are assigned as the names of the three chords of the ancient musical instrument, the lyre.

Alternatively, later they were called Cephisso, Apollonis, and Borysthenis - names which characterize them as daughters of Apollo.

A later tradition recognized a set of four Muses: Thelxinoë, Aoide, Archē, and Melete, said to be daughters of Zeus and Plusia or of Ouranos.
One of the people frequently associated with the Muses was Pierus.

Mythology 

According to Hesiod's Theogony (seventh century BC), they were daughters of Zeus, king of the gods, and Mnemosyne, Titan goddess of memory. Hesiod in Theogony narrates that the Muses brought to people forgetfulness, that is, the forgetfulness of pain and the cessation of obligations.

For Alcman and Mimnermus, they were even more primordial, springing from the early deities Ouranos and Gaia. Gaia is Mother Earth, an early mother goddess who was worshipped at Delphi from prehistoric times, long before the site was rededicated to Apollo, possibly indicating a transfer to association with him after that time.

Sometimes the Muses are referred to as water nymphs, associated with the springs of Helicon and with Pieris. It was said that the winged horse Pegasus touched his hooves to the ground on Helicon, causing four sacred springs to burst forth, from which the Muses, also known as pegasides, were born. Athena later tamed the horse and presented him to the Muses (compare the Roman inspiring nymphs of springs, the Camenae, the Völva of Norse Mythology and also the apsaras in the mythology of classical India).

Classical writers set Apollo as their leader,  ('Apollo Muse-leader'). In one myth, the Muses judged a contest between Apollo and Marsyas. They also gathered the pieces of the dead body of Orpheus, son of Calliope, and buried them in Leivithra. In a later myth, Thamyris challenged them to a singing contest. They won and punished Thamyris by blinding him and robbing him of his singing ability.

According to a myth from Ovid's Metamorphoses—alluding to the connection of Pieria with the Muses—Pierus, king of Macedon, had nine daughters he named after the nine Muses, believing that their skills were a great match to the Muses. He thus challenged the Muses to a match, resulting in his daughters, the Pierides, being turned into chattering jays (with  often erroneously translated as 'magpies') for their presumption.

Pausanias records a tradition of two generations of Muses; the first are the daughters of Ouranos and Gaia, the second of Zeus and Mnemosyne. Another, rarer genealogy is that they are daughters of Harmonia (the daughter of Aphrodite and Ares), which contradicts the myth in which they were dancing at the wedding of Harmonia and Cadmus.

Children
Calliope had two sons, Ialemus and Orpheus, with Apollo. In another version of the story, the father of Orpheus was Oeagrus, but Apollo adopted him and taught him the skill of lyre while Calliope trained him in singing.

Linus was said to have been the son of Apollo and one of the Muses, either Calliope or Terpsichore or Urania. Rhesus was the son of Strymon and Calliope or Euterpe.

The sirens were the children of Achelous and Melpomene or Terpsichore. Kleopheme was the daughter of Erato and Malos. Hyacinth was the son of Clio, according to an unpopular account.

Hymenaeus was assigned as Apollo's son by one of the muses, either Calliope, or Clio, or Terpsichore, or Urania. Corybantes were the children of Thalia and Apollo.

Cult

The Muses had several temples and shrines in ancient Greece, their two main cult centres being Mount Helikon in Boiotia and Pieria in Makedonia. 
Strabo wrote: 
"Helikon, not far distant from Parnassos, rivals it both in height and in circuit; for both are rocky and covered with snow, and their circuit comprises no large extent of territory. Here are the temple of the Mousai and Hippukrene and the cave of the Nymphai called the Leibethrides; and from this fact one might infer that those who consecrated Helikon to the Mousai were Thrakians, the same who dedicated Pieris and Leibethron and Pimpleia [in Pieria] to the same goddesses. The Thrakians used to be called Pieres, but, now that they have disappeared, the Makedonians hold these places."
The cult of the Muses was also commonly connected to that of Apollo.

Emblems

Some Greek writers give the names of the nine Muses as Kallichore, Helike, Eunike, Thelxinoë, Terpsichore, Euterpe, Eukelade, Dia, and Enope.

In Renaissance and Neoclassical art, the dissemination of emblem books such as Cesare Ripa's Iconologia (1593 and many further editions) helped standardize the depiction of the Muses in sculpture and painting, so they could be distinguished by certain props. These props, or emblems, became readily identifiable by the viewer, enabling one immediately to recognize the Muse and the art with which she had become associated. Here again, Calliope (epic poetry) carries a writing tablet; Clio (history) carries a scroll and books; Euterpe (song and elegiac poetry) carries a flute, the aulos; Erato (lyric poetry) is often seen with a lyre and a crown of roses; Melpomene (tragedy) is often seen with a tragic mask; Polyhymnia (sacred poetry) is often seen with a pensive expression; Terpsichore (choral dance and song) is often seen dancing and carrying a lyre; Thalia (comedy) is often seen with a comic mask; and Urania (astronomy) carries a pair of compasses and the celestial globe.

Functions

In society

The Greek word  is a common noun as well as a type of goddess: it literally means 'art' or 'poetry'. According to Pindar, to "carry a " is 'to excel in the arts'.

The Muses, therefore, were both the embodiments and sponsors of performed metrical speech:  (whence the English term music) was just "one of the arts of the Muses". Others included science, geography, mathematics, philosophy, and especially art, drama, and inspiration. In the archaic period, before the widespread availability of books (scrolls), this included nearly all of learning. The first Greek book on astronomy, by Thales, took the form of dactylic hexameters, as did many works of pre-Socratic philosophy. The Histories of Herodotus, whose primary medium of delivery was public recitation, were divided by Alexandrian editors into nine books, named after the nine Muses.

For poet and "law-giver" Solon, the Muses were "the key to the good life"; since they brought both prosperity and friendship. Solon sought to perpetuate his political reforms by establishing recitations of his poetry—complete with invocations to his practical-minded Muses—by Athenian boys at festivals each year. He believed that the Muses would help inspire people to do their best.

In literature

Ancient authors and their imitators invoke Muses when writing poetry, hymns or epic history. The invocation occurs near the beginning of their work. It asks for help or inspiration from the Muses, or simply invites the Muse to sing directly through the author.

Originally, the invocation of the Muse was an indication that the speaker was working inside the poetic tradition, according to the established formulas. For example:

These things declare to me from the beginning,

ye Muses who dwell in the house of Olympus,

and tell me which of them first came to be.

— Hesiod (c. 700 BCE), Theogony (Hugh G. Evelyn-White translation, 2015)

Sing to me of the man, Muse, the man of twists and turns

driven time and again off course, once he had plundered

the hallowed heights of Troy.
—Homer (c. 700 - 600 BCE), in Book I of The Odyssey (Robert Fagles translation, 1996)

O Muse! the causes and the crimes relate;
What goddess was provok'd, and whence her hate;

For what offence the Queen of Heav'n began

To persecute so brave, so just a man; [...] 
—Virgil (c. 29 - 19 BCE), in Book I of the Aeneid (John Dryden translation, 1697)

Besides Homer and Virgil, other famous works that included an invocation of the Muse are the first of the carmina by Catullus, Ovid's Metamorphoses and Amores, Dante's Inferno (Canto II), Chaucer's Troilus and Criseyde (Book II), Shakespeare's Henry V (Act 1, Prologue), his 38th sonnet, and Milton's Paradise Lost (openings of Books 1 and 7).

In cults and modern museums

When Pythagoras arrived at Croton, his first advice to the Crotoniates was to build a shrine to the Muses at the center of the city, to promote civic harmony and learning. Local cults of the Muses often became associated with springs or with fountains. The Muses themselves were sometimes called Aganippids because of their association with a fountain called Aganippe. Other fountains, Hippocrene and Pirene, were also important locations associated with the Muses. Some sources occasionally referred to the Muses as "Corycides" (or "Corycian nymphs") after a cave on Mount Parnassos, called the Corycian Cave. Pausanias referred to the Muses by the surnames "Ardalides" or "Ardaliotides", because of a sanctuary to them at Troezen said to have been built by the mythical Ardalus.

Often Muse-worship was associated with the hero-cults of poets: the tombs of Archilochus on Thasos and of Hesiod and Thamyris in Boeotia all played host to festivals in which poetic recitations accompanied sacrifices to the Muses. Many Enlightenment figures sought to re-establish a "Cult of the Muses" in the 18th century. A famous Masonic lodge in pre-Revolutionary Paris was called Les Neuf Soeurs ('The Nine Sisters', that is, the Nine Muses); Voltaire, Benjamin Franklin, Danton, and other influential Enlightenment figures attended it. As a side-effect of this movement the word museum (originally, 'cult place of the Muses') came to refer to a place for the public display of knowledge.

Museia (Μούσεια) was a festival dedicated to Muses which was held every fifth year on the lower slopes of Mount Helicon in Boeotia. There was also another festival which was called Museia, which was celebrated in schools.

Places named after the Muses 
In New Orleans, Louisiana, there are streets named for all nine. It is commonly held that the local pronunciation of the names has been colorfully anglicized in an unusual manner by the "Yat" dialect. The pronunciations are actually in line with the French, Spanish, and Creole roots of the city.

Modern use in the arts 

The Muses are explicitly used in modern English to refer to an artistic inspiration, as when one cites one's own artistic muse, and also implicit in words and phrases such as amuse, museum (Latinised from —a place where the Muses were worshipped), music, and musing upon. In current literature, the influential role that the Muse plays has been extended to the political sphere.

Gallery

Genealogy

See also
 Apsara
 Artistic inspiration
 Divine inspiration
 Leibethra
 Pimpleia
 Saraswati
 Muses in popular culture

Notes

References

External links

 Muses in ancient art; ancientrome.ru
 Warburg Institute Iconographic Database (c. 1,000 images of the Muses)

Music and singing goddesses
Wisdom goddesses
 
Children of Zeus
Arts goddesses
Dance goddesses
Knowledge goddesses
Greek goddesses
Women of Apollo
Musicians in Greek mythology
Olympian deities